Moorestown is a township in Burlington County in the U.S. state of New Jersey. It is an eastern suburb of Philadelphia and geographically part of the South Jersey region of the state. As of the 2020 United States census, the township's population was 21,355, an increase of 629 (+3.0%) from the 2010 census count of 20,726, which in turn reflected an increase of 1,709 (+9.0%) from the 19,017 counted in the 2000 census.

Moorestown was authorized to be incorporated as a township by an act of the New Jersey Legislature on March 11, 1922, from portions of Chester Township (now Maple Shade Township), subject to the approval of voters in the affected area in a referendum.  Voters approved the creation on April 25, 1922. The township is named for a Thomas Moore who settled in the area in 1722 and constructed a hotel though other sources attribute the name to poet Thomas Moore.

Chester Township had banned all liquor sales in 1915, and Moorestown retained the restrictions for more than 70 years after Prohibition ended in 1933. Referendums aiming to repeal the ban failed in both 1935 and 1953. In 2007, the township council approved a referendum that would allow the sale by auction of six liquor licenses (the state limit of one per every 3,000 residents), with estimates that each license could sell over $1 million each. The referendum did not receive enough votes to pass. In 2011, voters repealed the liquor ban; however, liquor sales in the township will be restricted to the Moorestown Mall.

In 2005, Moorestown was ranked number one in Money magazine's list of the 100 best places to live in America. The magazine screened over a thousand small towns and created a list of the top 100 for its August 2005 issue, in which Moorestown earned the top spot.

History

Main Street follows a ridge that had been occupied by the historic Lenni Lenape Native Americans. Two fine springs, one to the west (off Main Street before reaching the Perkins Center for the Arts, just by Roberts Elementary School) and one to the east (off North Stanwick Road) drew Native Americans and traders to the area.

In 1682, John and Sarah Roberts became the first English-speaking residents of Moorestown when they began to live in their home where the Roberts Monument is presently located on County Route 537 at the intersection with Route 73. In May 1686, three years after the founding of Philadelphia, John Rodman bought  on the west side of Chester Township, and Thomas Rodman bought  in the same area; this soon became known as the Village of Rodmantown. The growing area around the eastern spring was known as the Village of Chestertown.

In 1700, the first Society of Friends' Meeting House, built of logs, was erected on the King's Highway. Originally known as Meeting House Lane, Chester Avenue was laid out in 1720. The community at that time probably consisted of a few farmhouses along the King's Highway from Stanwick Road to Locust Street.

Thomas Moore and his wife Elizabeth settled here in 1722. In 1732, Moore purchased  of land on the north side of the King's Highway. The land ran from the west side of the Friends' graveyard on the northwest corner of the King's Highway and Meeting House Lane on the east, and west to Locust Street on the western boundary of his property and north to Second Street. Moore set up a hotel on the northwest corner of the King's Highway and Union streets (Cornerstone Bank and the Wawa now occupy opposite corners there). Given Moore's extensive property ownership, the name Moorestown gradually replaced Chester informally in the center of town. Finally, Moorestown formerly split off from Chester and became a Township.

The Coles Hotel, east of the corner of Main and Chester, was a stop on the stagecoach route connecting Camden with Trenton and Philadelphia. Construction of the railroad in 1867 superseded the stagecoaches and connected Mount Holly Township and Camden.

A tavern built in 1745 by John Cox at what is now Main and Schooley streets was taken over in 1778 during the Revolutionary War by Hessian officers retreating from Philadelphia. In the years after the war, it was used for a town hall before 1812, when what is now called "Old Town Hall" was constructed.

A house constructed in 1742 by John Cowperthwaite at King's Highway and Lenola Road is listed in the Library of Congress with details of the house recorded in 1937 by the Historic American Buildings Survey of the United States Department of the Interior.

Quakers built Moorestown's first two schools in 1785. A brick schoolhouse was located near what is now the intersection of Route 73 and the Kings Highway overpass. A stone schoolhouse was located adjacent to the present Friends Meeting House at the intersection of Chester Avenue and Main Street. The first district school was opened in 1810. The first free Moorestown public school was established in 1873.

Vernon Hill's  mansion Villa Collina—Italian for "Hill House"—the largest private residence in New Jersey, is located in Moorestown.

Moorestown's Quaker heritage is discussed in Moorestown resident and native historian William H. Kingston's book, Moorestown's Third Century: The Quaker Legacy.

Geography
According to the U.S. Census Bureau, the township had a total area of 14.94 square miles (38.70 km2), including 14.73 square miles (38.15 km2) of land and 0.21 square miles (0.55 km2) of water (1.43%).

The township is located in southwest Burlington County and borders Maple Shade Township to the south, Cinnaminson Township, and Delran Township to the west, Willingboro Township on the north and Mount Laurel Township to the east.

Moorestown-Lenola is an unincorporated community and census-designated place located within Moorestown, which had a 2010 population of 14,217.

Other unincorporated communities, localities and place names located partially or completely within the township include Bortons Landing, North Bend, Stanwick and West Moorestown.

Climate
The climate in the Moorestown area is characterized by hot, humid summers and generally mild to cooler winters.  According to the Köppen Climate Classification system, Moorestown Township has a humid subtropical climate, abbreviated "Cfa" on climate maps.

Demographics

2010 census

The Census Bureau's 2006–2010 American Community Survey showed that (in 2010 inflation-adjusted dollars) median household income was $108,655 (with a margin of error of +/− $6,347) and the median family income was $129,217 (+/− $6,334). Males had a median income of $100,266 (+/− $4,901) versus $60,057 (+/− $11,139) for females. The per capita income for the township was $58,458 (+/− $3,172). About 1.4% of families and 2.5% of the population were below the poverty line, including 3.0% of those under age 18 and 2.8% of those age 65 or over.

2000 census
At the 2000 census, there were 19,017 people, 6,971 households, and 5,270 families residing in the township. The racial makeup of the township was 89.19% White, 5.69% African American, 0.16% Native American, 3.27% Asian, 0.01% Pacific Islander, 0.43% from other races, and 1.26% from two or more races. Hispanic or Latino of any race were 1.75% of the population.

There were 6,971 households, of which 37.0% had children under the age of 18 living with them, 64.3% were married couples living together, 9.2% had a female householder with no husband present, and 24.4% were non-families. 21.0% of all households were made up of individuals, and 10.7% had someone living alone who was 65 years of age or older. The average household size was 2.68 and the average family size was 3.13.

Age distribution was 27.4% under the age of 18, 4.4% from 18 to 24, 25.4% from 25 to 44, 26.3% from 45 to 64, and 16.4% who were 65 years of age or older. The median age was 41 years. For every 100 females, there were 89.4 males. For every 100 females age 18 and over, there were 84.9 males.

The median household income was $78,826, and the median family income was $94,844. Males had a median income of $74,773 versus $39,148 for females. The per capita income for the township was $42,154. About 2.4% of families and 3.4% of the population were below the poverty line, including 3.3% of those under age 18 and 3.6% of those age 65 or over.

Economy
Several notable businesses house offices and operations in Moorestown. National and international corporations located in Moorestown Township include Destination Maternity, Lockheed Martin, Comcast Cable, Coca-Cola, and the United States Navy.

Otis Elevator has its largest U.S. branch in Moorestown outside of the Otis Elevator headquarters located in Farmington, Connecticut.

BAYADA Home Health Care, which employs over 18,000 nursing support staff in 250 offices throughout the United States and India, has its international headquarters in Moorestown.

Government

Local government
Moorestown's municipal government operates within the Faulkner Act (formally known as the Optional Municipal Charter Law) under Council-Manager plan E, which was implemented as of January 1, 1967, based on the recommendations of a Charter Study Commission. This form of government is used in 42 municipalities (of the 564) statewide. The Township Council is comprised of five members, who are elected at-large in partisan elections to four-year terms of office on a staggered basis, with either two or three seats coming up for election in even-numbered years. At a reorganization meeting held in January after each election, the council selects a mayor and a deputy mayor from among its members. The township manager, a full-time professional administrator, is appointed by the council. Under the township's administrative code and the Faulkner Act, the manager has the township's executive and administrative authority and responsibility. The township manager is Kevin Aberant.

In 2004, Moorestown elected a majority Democratic council for the first time in its history. In 2008, the Moorestown Republicans won back three seats, giving them a 4–1 majority starting in 2009. On Election Day 2012, Republicans Victoria Napolitano (5,580 votes), and Phil Garwood (5,467 votes), along with Democrat J. Greg Newcomer (5,345 votes), won election to the three open seats on the township council, outpacing Republican Pete Palko (5,321 votes) and Democrats Brian Sattinger (4,899 votes) and Mark Hines (4,869 votes). Republicans maintained a 4–1 majority, and Stacey Jordan was sworn in as Moorestown's first female mayor on January 7, 2013.

During summer 2007, the township hall suffered smoke and water damage caused by an electrical fire. The township offices were temporarily located at 2 Executive Place,  Moorestown Township with council meetings held during that time at the William Allen Middle School Auditorium and court sessions are conducted in Maple Shade. On December 10, 2012, Town Council members John Button, Greg Gallo, Stacey Jordan, Chris Chiacchio, and Mike Testa, along with Councilmembers-elect Victoria Napolitano and Greg Newcomer, broke ground on the new Town Hall, which was completed in 2014 

In the 2014 elections, Stacey Jordan was re-elected to council along with her Republican running mate, Manny Delgado, who made history by becoming Moorestown's first Hispanic Councilman when he took office in January 2015. During the same reorganization meeting, Victoria Napolitano became Moorestown's youngest mayor ever at the age of 26, and may also be the youngest female to ever hold the office of mayor statewide.

In December 2015, the township council selected Lisa Petriello from three candidates nominated by the Democratic municipal committee to fill the seat expiring in 2016 that was vacated by Greg Newcomer when he left office the previous month.

In November 2016, Republican incumbent Victoria Napolitano won re-election along with her Republican running mate Mike Locatell and Democrat Lisa Petriello, continuing the Republican Party's 4-to-1 majority. At the township's January 2017 reorganization meeting, Manny Delgado was elected by his peers as Moorestown's first Hispanic mayor.

In 2018, the township had an average property tax bill of $11,241, the highest in the county, compared to an average bill of $8,767 statewide.

In January 2021, the Township Council selected Quinton Law to fill the seat expiring in December 2022 that had been held by Brian Donnelly until he resigned from office. The appointment made Law the youngest and the first Black councilmember in township history. Law served on an interim basis until the November 2021 general election, when he was elected to serve the balance of the term of office.

, the Moorestown Township Council is comprised of Mayor Nicole Gillespie (D, term on committee and as mayor ends December 31, 2022), Deputy Mayor Sue Mammarella (D, term on committee ends 2024; term as deputy mayor ends 2022), Quinton Law (D, 2022; elected to serve an unexpired term), Jake Van Dyken (D, 2024) and David Zipin (D, 2024). This is the first time this century that Moorestown has had a fully Democratic Council.

Mayors

 Nicole Gillespie, 2020 to present
 Lisa Petriello, 2019 to 2020
 Stacey Jordan, 2018
 Manny Delgado (born 1970), 2017 to 2018. First Hispanic mayor.
 Phil Garwood (born 1959), 2016 to 2017.
 Victoria Napolitano (born 1988), 2015 to 2016. Youngest mayor and youngest woman to become a mayor in New Jersey.
 Chris Chiacchio (born 1967), 2014 to 2015.
 Stacey Jordan (born 1970), 2013 to 2014. First female mayor.
 John Button (born 1942), 2011 to 2012.
 Daniel Roccato (born 1961), 2009 to 2010 
 Kevin E. Aberant (born 1969), 2005 to 2008. First Democratic mayor.
 Michael L. Sanyour, 2003 to 2004.
 Howard Miller (born 1937), 1997 to 2002.
 Walter T. Maahs Jr. (1927–2011), 1988 to 1996.
 Francis L. Bodine (born 1936), 1981 to 1987.
 James Euel Palmer (1932–2000), 1976 to 1980.
 William A. Angus Jr. (1923–2006), 1971–1976.
 John L. Call, 1969 to 1970.
 Charles Walton, 1967 to 1968.
 Albert Ellis, 1962 to 1966.
 Edwin B. Forsythe (1916–1984), 1957 to 1962.
 William J. Hall Jr., 1954 to 1956
 Allen Nixon, 1943 to 1953.
 Fred P. Smith, 1938 to 1942.
 Benjamin Haines, 1935 to 1937.
 John C. Dudley, 1932 to 1934.
 Frederick W. Grube, 1929 to 1931.

Federal, state, and county representation
Moorestown is located in the 3rd Congressional District and is part of New Jersey's 7th state legislative district. Prior to the 2011 reapportionment following the 2010 Census, Moorestown Township had been in the 8th state legislative district.

 

Burlington County is governed by a Board of County Commissioners comprised of five members who are chosen at-large in partisan elections to serve three-year terms of office on a staggered basis, with either one or two seats coming up for election each year; at an annual reorganization meeting, the board selects a director and deputy director from among its members to serve a one-year term. , Burlington County's Commissioners are
Director Felicia Hopson (D, Willingboro Township, term as commissioner ends December 31, 2024; term as director ends 2023),
Deputy Director Tom Pullion (D, Edgewater Park, term as commissioner and as deputy director ends 2023),
Allison Eckel (D, Medford, 2025),
Daniel J. O'Connell (D, Delran Township, 2024) and 
Balvir Singh (D, Burlington Township, 2023). 
Burlington County's Constitutional Officers are
County Clerk Joanne Schwartz (R, Southampton Township, 2023)
Sheriff James H. Kostoplis (D, Bordentown, 2025) and 
Surrogate Brian J. Carlin (D, Burlington Township, 2026).

Politics
As of March 2011, there were a total of 13,978 registered voters in Moorestown Township, of which 3,955 (28.3% vs. 33.3% countywide) were registered as Democrats, 5,126 (36.7% vs. 23.9%) were registered as Republicans and 4,887 (35.0% vs. 42.8%) were registered as Unaffiliated. There were 10 voters registered as Libertarians or Greens. Among the township's 2010 Census population, 67.4% (vs. 61.7% in Burlington County) were registered to vote, including 92.8% of those ages 18 and over (vs. 80.3% countywide).

In the 2012 presidential election, Democrat Barack Obama received 5,789 votes (50.1% vs. 58.5% countywide), ahead of Republican Mitt Romney with 5,656 votes (49% vs. 40.5%) and other candidates with 102 votes (0.9% vs. 1.0%), among the 11,623 ballots cast by the township's 14,801 registered voters, for a turnout of 78.5% (vs. 74.5% in Burlington County). In the 2008 presidential election, Democrat Barack Obama received 6,099 votes (51.9% vs. 58.4% countywide), ahead of Republican John McCain with 5,435 votes (46.3% vs. 39.9%) and other candidates with 98 votes (0.8% vs. 1.0%), among the 11,746 ballots cast by the township's 14,274 registered voters, for a turnout of 82.3% (vs. 80.0% in Burlington County). In the 2004 presidential election, Republican George W. Bush received 5,792 votes (50.4% vs. 46.0% countywide), ahead of Democrat John Kerry with 5,576 votes (48.6% vs. 52.9%) and other candidates with 66 votes (0.6% vs. 0.8%), among the 11,482 ballots cast by the township's 13,714 registered voters, for a turnout of 83.7% (vs. 78.8% in the whole county).

In the 2013 gubernatorial election, Republican Chris Christie received 4,683 votes (66.4% vs. 61.4% countywide), ahead of Democrat Barbara Buono with 2,210 votes (31.3% vs. 35.8%) and other candidates with 71 votes (1.0% vs. 1.2%), among the 7,058 ballots cast by the township's 14,925 registered voters, yielding a 47.3% turnout (vs. 44.5% in the county). In the 2009 gubernatorial election, Republican Chris Christie received 4,128 votes (53.4% vs. 47.7% countywide), ahead of Democrat Jon Corzine with 3,166 votes (40.9% vs. 44.5%), Independent Chris Daggett with 345 votes (4.5% vs. 4.8%) and other candidates with 53 votes (0.7% vs. 1.2%), among the 7,736 ballots cast by the township's 14,206 registered voters, yielding a 54.5% turnout (vs. 44.9% in the county).

Historic district

The Moorestown Historic District is a  historic district encompassing the community. It was added to the National Register of Historic Places on August 30, 1990, for its significance in architecture, commerce, community development, and exploration/settlement from 1720 to 1940. The district includes 351 contributing buildings and four contributing sites. Breidenhart, Moorestown Friends School and Meetinghouse, Smith Mansion, and Town Hall, which were previously listed individually on the NRHP, contribute to the district.

Education
The Moorestown Township Public Schools serves students in pre-kindergarten through twelfth grade. As of the 2018–19 school year, the district, comprised of six schools, had an enrollment of 3,997 students and 348.9 classroom teachers (on an FTE basis), for a student–teacher ratio of 11.5:1. Schools in the district (with 2018–19 enrollment data from the National Center for Education Statistics) are 
George C. Baker Elementary School (378 students; in grades Pre-K–3), 
Mary E. Roberts Elementary School (346; Pre-K–3), 
South Valley Elementary School (405; Pre-K–3), 
Moorestown Upper Elementary School (916; 4–6), 
William Allen Middle School (638; 7–8) and 
Moorestown High School (1,293; 9–12).

Students from Moorestown, and from all of Burlington County, are eligible to attend the Burlington County Institute of Technology, a countywide public school district that serves the vocational and technical education needs of students at the high school and post-secondary level at its campuses in Medford and Westampton.

Moorestown Friends School is a private Quaker school located at East Main Street and Chester Avenue. The school serves approximately 700 students from preschool through twelfth grade.

Our Lady of Good Counsel School, which operates under the auspices of the Roman Catholic Diocese of Trenton, is attached to Our Lady of Good Counsel Parish; located behind the church on Prospect Avenue, it was founded in 1927 and has about 480 students from nursery through eighth grade. In 2015, the school was one of 15 schools in New Jersey, and one of six private schools, recognized as a National Blue Ribbon School in the exemplary high performing category by the United States Department of Education.

Additionally there are students from Moorestown who attend Resurrection Catholic School in Cherry Hill. This school is under the Roman Catholic Diocese of Camden.

Transportation

Roads and highways

The most prominent highway serving Moorestown is Route 38. County Route 537 also passes through the town. Both roads run east–west and parallel to each other with no intersection.

Public transportation
NJ Transit provides bus service to Philadelphia on routes 317 (from Asbury Park), and during rush hours weekdays, on the 414. Other buses such as the 407, 413 and 457 run between the Moorestown Mall and the Walter Rand Transportation Center in Camden, from which there are connecting buses into Philadelphia and a station on the PATCO Speedline with service between Center City Philadelphia and Lindenwold. Burlington County provides rush hour public transit van service on the Burlink B9 route on weekdays from the Palmyra River Line station to the Moorestown Mall and some intermediate points.

Moorestown does not have its own train station, though the original plan of the PATCO line had a station in Moorestown. Residents can drive to train stations in the nearby communities of Haddonfield and Lindenwold for access to the PATCO Speedline, and to Palmyra for NJ Transit's River Line service which connects to New York Penn Station through Trenton. NJ Transit Rail Operations still owns the single-track railway in the township, running from Pennsauken Township to Mount Holly, as a rail trail.

Miracle on the Hudson 
On June 5, 2011, J. Supor & Son transported the fuselage of US Airways Flight 1549 through Moorestown en route to the Carolinas Aviation Museum in Charlotte, North Carolina. The convoy spent over 1.5 hours working to negotiate a single right turn in the center of the town. This was the most difficult maneuver on the entire seven-day, 788-mile journey. The difficulty of this one turn was known in advance. In order to negotiate the turn the team had to temporarily remove a street light and the corner of a grave yard fence.

Notable people

People who were born in, residents of, or otherwise closely associated with Moorestown Township include:

 Diane Allen (born 1948), represents the 7th legislative district in the New Jersey General Assembly
 Samuel Leeds Allen (1841–1918), inventor and manufacturer of farm equipment and the Flexible Flyer sled
 Mary Ellen Avery (1927–2011), pediatrician, whose research efforts helped lead to the discovery of the main cause of respiratory distress syndrome in premature babies
 Emily Bacon (1891–1972), physician who was the first pediatric specialist in Philadelphia
 Lillian Lewis Batchelor (1907–1977), librarian who was president of the American Association of School Librarians
 Sam Bishop (born 1983), professional soccer goalkeeper
 David Bispham (1857–1921), opera singer
 Francis L. Bodine (born 1936), represented the 8th legislative district in the New Jersey General Assembly from 1994–2008
 Hugh Borton (1903–1995), Japanese studies expert who served for 10 years as president of Haverford College
 T. J. Brennan (born 1989), defenseman for the Toronto Maple Leafs of the NHL
 Dave Brock (born 1967), wide receivers coach for the Atlanta Falcons of the National Football League
 Lem Burnham (born 1947), former National Football League executive and player
 Kevin Chamberlin (born 1963), actor
 Bobby Clarke (born 1949), former National Hockey League player with the Philadelphia Flyers
 Gary Close (born 1957), assistant coach for the Wisconsin Badgers men's basketball team
 Josh Cody (1892–1961), member of the College Football Hall of Fame
 John S. Collins (1837–1928), developer of Miami Beach, Florida
 Herb Conaway (born 1963), politician who has served in the New Jersey General Assembly since 1998, where he represents the 7th Legislative District
 Phil Costa (born 1987), former football player with the Dallas Cowboys
 Brad Costello (born 1974), former American football punter who played for the Cincinnati Bengals of the NFL and the Scottish Claymores of NFL Europe
 Elisabeth Elliot (1926–2015), Christian author and speaker
 Colin Farrell, head coach of the University of Pennsylvania lightweight rowing team
 Dereck Faulkner (born 1985), wide receiver who played in the NFL for the Philadelphia Eagles
 Edwin B. Forsythe (1916–1984), member of the United States House of Representatives from New Jersey who served as mayor of Moorestown from 1957–1962
 Walter French (1899–1984), football All-American and professional baseball player for the Philadelphia Athletics, 1923–1929
 Joseph H. Gaskill (1851–1935), judge on the New Jersey Court of Common Pleas and Justice of the New Jersey Supreme Court from 1893 to 1896
 John F. Gerry (1926–1995), former chief United States district judge on the United States District Court for the District of New Jersey
 Chris Gheysens (born ), president and chief executive officer of Wawa Inc.
 Bill Guerin (born 1970), right winger who earned the Stanley Cup with both the New Jersey Devils and Pittsburgh Penguins
 Edward Harris (1799–1863), introduced the Percheron horse to America; benefactor of John James Audubon; lived at Smith-Cadbury Mansion
 Vernon Hill (born 1946), founder and former chairman, president, and chief executive officer of Commerce Bancorp and Commerce Bank of Cherry Hill Township, New Jersey
 Leon A. Huff (born 1942), co-founder and vice-chairman of Gamble-Huff Music, a songwriting and record production team who have written and produced 15 gold singles and 22 gold albums
 Alfred Hunt (1817–1888), first president of Bethlehem Iron Company, precursor of Bethlehem Steel Corporation
 Elisha Hunt (1779–1873), principal entrepreneur behind the company that built the historic steamboat Enterprise
 Esther Hunt (1751–1820), pioneer who lived on America's frontier as a wife, a mother and a leader in her Quaker faith
 John Hunt (1740–1824), Quaker minister and journalist
 Eldridge R. Johnson (1867–1945), founder of Victor Talking Machine Company
 Jevon Kearse (born 1976), former NFL defensive end who played for the Philadelphia Eagles and Tennessee Titans
 Tim Kerr (born 1960), former NHL right wing who played for the Philadelphia Flyers, New York Rangers and Hartford Whalers
 Ruth G. King (born 1933), educational psychologist who was the first woman to serve as president of the Association of Black Psychologists
 C. Harry Knowles (1928–2020), physicist, entrepreneur, philanthropist, and a prolific inventor who held some 400 patents and served on the Moorestown council in the 1980s
 Matt Langel (born 1977), head coach for the Colgate Raiders men's basketball team
 Jonathan V. Last (born 1974), columnist for The Weekly Standard
 Al LeConey (1901–1959), gold medal winner in the 4x100 meter relay at the 1924 Summer Olympics
 Kathy Linden (born 1938), pop singer who scored hits on the U.S. Billboard Hot 100 with "Billy" and "Goodbye Jimmy, Goodbye"
 Donovan McNabb (born 1976), former professional football player for the Philadelphia Eagles
 Stephen W. Meader (1892–1977), author of more than 40 novels for boys and girls
 Freddie Mitchell (born 1978), former professional football player for the Philadelphia Eagles
 Victoria Napolitano (born 1988), politician who became Moorestown's youngest mayor, when she took office in 2015 at age 26
 David A. Norcross (born 1937), politician who ran for United States Senate in 1976 and served as chairman of the New Jersey Republican State Committee
 Brendan O'Connor (born ), recipient of the Distinguished Service Cross for his heroic action in Afghanistan
 Christine O'Donnell (born 1969), Republican candidate in Delaware's 2010 United States Senate special election
 Terrell Owens (born 1973), former professional football player who played for the Philadelphia Eagles and other teams
 Sal Paolantonio (born 1956), Philadelphia-based bureau reporter for ESPN
 Alice Paul (1885–1977), leader of a campaign for women's suffrage resulting in passage of the 19th Amendment to the U.S. Constitution
 Doug Pederson (born 1968), head coach of the Philadelphia Eagles of the National Football League
 Jim Picken (1903–1975), early professional basketball player
 John Pryor (1966–2008), serviceman and surgeon who was killed on duty in Mosul, Iraq
 Samuel K. Robbins (1853–1926), politician who served as Speaker of the New Jersey General Assembly and president of the New Jersey Senate
 Julie Robenhymer (born 1981), Miss New Jersey 2005
 Jeremy Roenick (born 1970), professional hockey player, former player for the Philadelphia Flyers
 Jon Runyan (born 1973), football player for the Philadelphia Eagles, Houston Oilers and San Diego Chargers who was elected to represent New Jersey's 3rd congressional district from 2011 to 2015
 Jon Runyan Jr. (born 1997), guard in the NFL for the Green Bay Packers
 Steve Sabol (1942–2012), president and co-founder of NFL Films
 Ulf Samuelsson (born 1964), professional hockey player, former player for the Philadelphia Flyers
 Lauren Schmetterling (born 1988), rower who won a total of three gold medals in the Women's eight competition at the 2013 World Rowing Championships, the 2015 World Rowing Championships and the 2016 Summer Olympics in Rio de Janeiro
 Katherine Shindle (born 1977), Miss America 1998 and actress
 Ben Simmons (born 1996), professional basketball player for the Philadelphia 76ers
 Scott Terry (born 1976), songwriter and singer who has fronted the band Red Wanting Blue
 Albert W. Van Duzer (1917–1999), bishop of the Episcopal Diocese of New Jersey, serving from 1973 to 1982
 John Vanbiesbrouck (born 1963), professional hockey player, former player for the Philadelphia Flyers
 James Weinstein, transportation planner and executive who served as executive director of New Jersey Transit
 Brian Willison (born 1977), director of the Parsons Institute for Information Mapping
 Helen Van Pelt Wilson (1901–2003), garden writer
 Esther V. Yanai (1928–2003), advocate for open-space preservation in Moorestown
 Albert Young (born 1985), former football player for the University of Iowa and Minnesota Vikings
 Tim Young (born 1968), silver medal-winning rower in the quadruple sculls at the 1996 Summer Olympics
 Martha Zweig (born 1942), poet

Moorestown in fiction
 The song "Moorestown" by Sun Kil Moon is set in Moorestown.

See also

 National Register of Historic Places listings in Burlington County, New Jersey

References

External links
 Moorestown Township official website

Further reading

 
 
 

 
1922 establishments in New Jersey
Faulkner Act (council–manager)
Populated places established in 1922
Townships in Burlington County, New Jersey